Honewort may refer to either of two species of plants in the carrot family:
Trinia glauca, native to Eurasia
Cryptotaenia canadensis, native to eastern North America